Leanster Brudeli 625L is a three-wheeled vehicle, with two wheels in front and one rear wheel. The vehicle is best described as something in between a motorcycle and ATV-quad. It has corners which lean in, like a motorcycle, while at the same time possessing a lot of the stability and a shorter brake length like a sport quad. It is intended both for on-road and off-road use.

It was designed by the Norwegian designer Atle Stubberud from Soon Design.

See also
List of motorized trikes

External links
Brudeli Leanster
Soon Design
Atle Stubberud

Experimental vehicles
Three-wheeled motor vehicles